Pochin is a surname. Notable people with the surname include:

Agnes Pochin (1825–1908), British campaigner for women's rights
Edward Pochin (1909–1990), British physician
Henry Pochin (1824–1895), British industrial chemist and politician
Juliette Pochin (born 1971),  Welsh classically trained mezzo-soprano singer, composer/arranger, and record producer